American country music singer Scotty McCreery has released five studio albums (including one Christmas album), two compilation albums, two extended plays, ten singles, and ten music videos. McCreery rose to fame after winning the tenth season of American Idol in 2011.

McCreery released his first single (his American Idol coronation song) "I Love You This Big" after his win on May 25, 2011. The single peaked at number eleven on the Billboard Hot 100 and number  fourteen on the Hot Country Songs chart. He released his debut studio album, Clear as Day on October 4, 2011, which debuted at number one on the Billboard Top Country Albums chart and reached number one on the Billboard 200. His second album, Christmas with Scotty McCreery was released on October 16, 2012.  His third album, See You Tonight, was released on October 15, 2013. McCreery's fourth studio album, Seasons Change was released on March 16, 2018. On September 17, 2021, McCreery released his fifth studio album, Same Truck.

Albums

Studio albums

Compilation albums

Extended plays

Singles

Other charted songs

Music videos

Notes

References

American Idol discographies
Country music discographies
Discographies of American artists